A calaca (a colloquial Mexican Spanish name for skeleton) is a figure of a skull or skeleton (usually human) commonly used for decoration during the Mexican Day of the Dead festival, although they are made all year round.

Description
Tracing their origins from Mayan imagery, calacas are frequently shown with marigold flowers and foliage. As with other aspects of the Day of the Dead festival, calacas are generally depicted as joyous rather than mournful figures. They are often shown wearing festive clothing, dancing, and playing musical instruments to indicate a happy afterlife. This draws on the Mexican belief that no dead soul likes to be thought of sadly, and that death should be a joyous occasion. This goes back to Aztec beliefs, one of the few calaca to remain after the Spanish conquest.

Calacas used in the festival include carved skull masks worn by revelers, small figures made out of carved wood or fired clay, and sweet treats in the form of skulls or skeletons. Calacas are sometimes made of wood, stone, or even candy.

A popular phrase among Mexicans and those Latinos that personally know someone is "se lo (la) llevó la calaca" after someone has died, literally meaning "the calaca took him (her)" or "death took him (her)".

In Guatemala, "calaca" is understood as "death". The figure of a bare skeleton represents death and implies fear of death.  Thus, it is not normally utilized as a joyful image.

Popular culture

Calacas are prominently featured as representations of the deceased in the animated films The Book of Life and Coco.

Calaca-like figures can be seen in the Tim Burton film Corpse Bride, Neil Gaiman's movie Coraline, video games such as LittleBigPlanet (2008) and Guacamelee! (2013), and the 1998 Tim Schafer computer game Grim Fandango.

In Monster High, Skelita Calaveras is a calaca and is the daughter of Los Esklitos (The Skeletons).

In El Tigre: The Adventures of Manny Rivera, the villain Sartana of the Dead is a calaca and commands various calacas that are in her service.

See also
 Calavera
 Cuco
 La Calavera Catrina
 Santa Muerte

Mexican culture
Day of the Dead